Valdivia earthquake

 1575 Valdivia earthquake
 1737 Valdivia earthquake
 1837 Valdivia earthquake
 1960 Valdivia earthquake